The 2007 NCAA Division I Tennis Championships were the 61st annual men's and 25th annual women's championships to determine the national champions of NCAA Division I men's and women's singles, doubles, and team collegiate tennis in the United States. The tournaments were played concurrently during May 2007 in Athens, Georgia.

Hosts Georgia defeated Illinois in the men's championship match, 4–0, to claim the Bulldogs' fifth team national title.

Meanwhile, Georgia Tech defeated UCLA in the women's title match, 4–2, to claim their first team national championship.

Host sites
This year's tournaments were played at the Dan Magill Tennis Complex at the University of Georgia in Athens, Georgia.

See also
NCAA Division II Tennis Championships (Men, Women)
NCAA Division III Tennis Championships (Men, Women)

References

External links
List of NCAA Men's Tennis Champions
List of NCAA Women's Tennis Champions

NCAA Division I tennis championships
NCAA Division I Tennis Championships
NCAA Division I Tennis Championships
NCAA Division I Tennis Championships
Tennis in California